Pollard is a surname. Notable people with the surname include:

A–B
 A. J. Pollard (born 1941), English medieval historian
 Al Pollard (1928–2002), American football player
 Albert Pollard, (1869–1948), British historian of Tudor era
 Albert C. Pollard (born 1967), American politician
 Alice Pollard, Solomon Islands activist
 Alfred Oliver Pollard, (1893-1960), British author, awarded Victoria Cross
 Alfred W. Pollard (1859–1944), English Shakespearian scholar and bibliographer
 Amos Pollard (1803–1836), American surgeon at the Battle of the Alamo
 Amy Elizabeth Rosalie Pollard-Imrie (known as Clare Imrie, 1870–1944), Franciscan mother abbess, builder of St Mary of the Angels RC church, Liverpool
 Sir Amyas Pollard, 3rd Baronet (1616–1701), English gentleman and royalist in the English Civil War
 Anastasia Pollard, American-born English painter
 Andrew Pollard (biologist), British vaccinologist
 Andrew Pollard (educator), British academic
 Anthony Pollard (born 1937), British army officer
 Ackquille Jean Pollard (born 1994), American rapper known as Bobby Shmurda
 Art Pollard (1927–1973), American racecar driver
 Asa Pollard (1735–1775), American soldier in the Revolutionary War
 Ash Pollard (born 1986), Australian cook and media personality
 Benjamin Pollard (1890–1967), English Anglican bishop
 Bernard Pollard (born 1984), NFL safety for the Tennessee Titans
 Brandon Pollard (born 1973), American soccer player
 Brian Pollard (born 1954), English footballer
 Bruce Pollard (born 1945), Australian rugby league footballer

C–E
 Calvin Pollard (1797-1850), American architect
 Carl Pollard (born 1947), American linguist
 Catherine Pollard (born 1960), Guyanese diplomat, Under Secretary-General of the United Nations
 Catherine Pollard (Scouting) (1918–2006), American scout master, first female scout master in the BSA
 Charles Pollard (disambiguation), several people
 Chris Pollard, American college baseball coach
 Clare Pollard (born 1978), English poet and dramatist
 Claude Pollard (1874–1942), Attorney General of Texas (1927–1929)
 Coral Bernadine Pollard (born c. 1940), Barbadian artist
 Courtland Pollard (1899–1977), American football coach
 Daisi Pollard (born 1980), American model
 Dan Pollard, Canadian broadcaster
 D. T. Pollard (Danny Pollard), American writer
 Daphne Pollard (1891–1978), Australian-born vaudeville performer, later US film actress
 Deana Pollard Sacks (born 1964), American legal educator and writer
 Darryl Pollard (born 1964), American football player
 David Pollard (disambiguation), several people
 Derek Pollard (born 1939), British academic and nuclear chemist
 DeRionne P. Pollard, President of Montgomery College since 2010
 Devonta Pollard (born 1994), American professional basketball player
 Dick Pollard (footballer) (1913–1966), Australian rules footballer 
Doug Pollard (born 1957), Canadian soccer player
 Ed Pollard (born 1962), Barbadian boxer
 Edward A. Pollard (1832–1872), American author of The Lost Cause and newspaperman with the Richmond Examiner 1832–1872
 Edwin Pollard (born 1942), High Commissioner of Barbados in London (2003–2008)
 Eric Pollard (skier), United States freestyle skier and film editor
 Ernest Pollard (disambiguation), several people
 Eve Pollard (born 1945), British journalist

F–J
 Frank Pollard (born 1957), American football player
 Frank Pollard (politician) (1870–1951), Australian politician
 Frederick Pollard (disambiguation), also Fritz Pollard, several people
 Gary Pollard (born 1959), English footballer
 George Pollard (disambiguation), several people
 Graham Pollard (1903–1976), English bookseller and bibliophile
 Greg Pollard (born 1960), Australian squash player
 Handré Pollard (born 1994), South African rugby union player playing for the Blue Bulls in the Super Rugby championship
 H. B. Pollard, first postmaster of Ashland, Kentucky 
 Harry Pollard (disambiguation), several people
 Helen Perlstein Pollard (born 1946), American academic ethnohistorian and archaeologist 
 Henry Moses Pollard (1836–1904), American politician
 Hugh Pollard (disambiguation), several people
 Ingrid Pollard (born 1953), English artist and photographer
 J. W. H. Pollard (1872–1957), American college sports coach
 Jack Pollard (1926–2002), Australian sports writer and historian of cricket
 James Pollard (1792–1867), British painter
 Jamie Pollard, American athletics director
 Jane Pollard (born 1972), English artist film maker
 Jill Pollard (born 1935), British gymnast
 Jim Pollard (1922–1993), American basketball player
 John Pollard (disambiguation), several people
 Jon Pollard (disambiguation), several people
 Jonathan Pollard, US intelligence analyst; Israeli spy
 Josephine Pollard (1834–1892), US hymn writer, author and poet
 Justin Pollard (born 1968), British historian and writer

K–P
 Keith Pollard (born 1950), American comic book artist
 Keith Pollard (rugby league) (born 1946), English rugby league footballer and coach
 Kerry Pollard (born 1944) an English politician
 Kevin Pollard (born 1958), Canadian politician
 Kieron Pollard (born 1987), West Indies cricketer
 Larry Pollard (born 1954), Canadian stock-car racing driver
 Lee Pollard (born 1979), English cricketer
 Leslie Pollard (born 1956), American Seventh-day Adventist minister
 Lewis Pollard (c.1465-1526), English Justice of the Common Pleas and MP
 Lindsey Pollard, Canadian animator
 Luke Pollard (born 1980), British politician
 Marcus Pollard (born 1972), American footballer
 Margaret Steuart Pollard (1904–1996), English scholar of Sanskrit and poet
 Marjorie Pollard (1899–1982), English hockey player
 Mark Pollard (born 1979), Falkland Islands politician
 Martin Pollard (born 1977), English cricketer
 Mary Pollard (1922–2005), English/Irish librarian and specialist in early printed books
 Michael Pollard (cricketer) (born 1989), New Zealand cricketer
 Michael J. Pollard (1939-2019), American actor
 Mother Pollard (c. 1882/1885–before 1963)), American church elder who participated in the 1955–1956 Montgomery Bus Boycott
 Myles Pollard (born 1972), Australian actor
 Nancy Pollard
 Nicholas Pollard Sr. (1924-2003), Belizean politician and trade union leader
 Nick Pollard (born 1950), British journalist
 Nicole Pollard, American fashion stylist
 Odell Pollard (1927–2015), Arkansas politician and attorney
 Pam Pollard, American politician active in Oklahoma
 Paul Pollard (born 1968), English cricketer
 Percy Pollard (1883–1948), Australian politician
 Percy F. Pollard (born 1892), British socialist activist

R–S
 Red Pollard (1909–1981), Canadian jockey, best remembered as the regular rider of Seabiscuit
 Reg Pollard (general) (1903–1978), Australian military officer, Chief of the General Staff from 1960 to 1963
 Reg Pollard (politician) (1894–1981), Australian politician
 Richard Pollard (disambiguation), including Dick Pollard, several people
 Robert Pollard (disambiguation), also for Bob Pollard, several people
 Robin Pollard, New Zealand academic
 Roy Pollard (1927–2012), rugby league footballer for Great Britain, England, and Dewsbury
 Royce Pollard (born 1939), former Mayor of Vancouver, Washington State, USA
 Royce Pollard (American football) (born 1989), American footballer
 Russell Pollard (born 1975), American rock musician
 Sam Pollard (missionary) (1864–), Bible Christian Church missionary to China and inventor of the "Pollard script"
 Scot Pollard (born 1975), American basketball player and current NBA TV analyst
 Scott M. Pollard (born 1970), American attorney and Rhode Island politician
 Sean Pollard (born 1991), Australian Paralympian
 Sidney Pollard (1925–1998), British economic and labour historian
 Snub Pollard (1889–1962), Australian-born vaudevillian, American silent film comedian
 Stephen Pollard (born 1964), British journalist, editor of The Jewish Chronicle
 Stephen Pollard (cricketer) (born 1971), English cricketer
 Stu Pollard (born 1967), American film producer, writer and director
 Stuart Pollard, Australian sailor and property developer
 Su Pollard (born 1949), English comedy actress who starred in the BBC TV sitcom Hi-de-Hi!

T–W
 Terry Pollard (1931–2009), American jazz pianist and vibraphone player
 Thomas Pollard (1597–1649×1655), English actor in the King's Men
 Thomas D. Pollard (born 1942), American biologist
 Tiffany Pollard (born 1982), American reality television star
 Tim Pollard (born 1964), English actor
 Timothy Pollard, American basketball player
 Tom Pollard (1857–1922), New Zealand comic opera producer and manager
 Tom Pollard (footballer) (1894–1941), Australian rules footballer
 Tony Pollard (American football) (born 1997), American football player
 Tony Pollard (archaeologist) (born 1965), British battlefield archaeologist and television presenter
 Trent Pollard (born 1972), American footballer
 Vic Pollard (born 1945), English-born cricketer, active in New Zealand
 Walter Pollard (1906–1945), English footballer with Burnley, West Ham, Fulham and Southampton
 William Pollard (Quaker) (1828–1893), British Quaker minister
 William B. Pollard III (born 1947), American military judge
 William G. Pollard (1911–1989), American physicist
 William L. Pollard, American college/university President/Dean of multiple institutions
 William Pollard-Urquhart (1815–1871), American writer on economic and policy issues

Fictional characters 
 Cayce Pollard, fictional protagonist of William Gibson's novel Pattern Recognition (2003)
 Charley Pollard, character from the Big Finish Doctor Who releases
 Eric Pollard, character from British soap opera Emmerdale
 Val Pollard, character from Emmerdale, formerly married to Eric
 Vicky Pollard, character from British comedy show Little Britain

See also
 Pollard (disambiguation)

English-language surnames